Robert Walpole, 2nd Earl of Orford, KB (1701 – 31 March 1751), was a British peer and politician, styled Lord Walpole from 1723 to 1745.

Origins

He was the eldest son of Sir Robert Walpole (1676–1745), the King's First Minister, now regarded as the first British Prime Minister, by his first wife Catherine Shorter. In 1723 his father declined a peerage for himself but did accept the offer on behalf of his 22-year-old son Robert who was thus raised to the peerage as Baron Walpole, of Walpole in the County of Norfolk.

Marriage
Circa 26 March 1724 Lord Walpole married the 15-year-old heiress Margaret Rolle (1709–1781), the only surviving daughter of Colonel Samuel Rolle (1646–1719), of Heanton Satchville, Petrockstowe. Margaret was the heiress to a junior branch of the great Rolle family of Stevenstone in Devon and to her paternal grandmother, born Lady Arabella Clinton, an aunt and co-heiress of her nephew Edward Clinton, 5th Earl of Lincoln and 13th Baron Clinton (d. 1692).

The marriage was not a success and Lady Walpole quarrelled violently with his whole family. After one son was born they lived apart and later obtained a legal separation.

In 1736 Hannah Norsa, a leading singer and actress at Covent Garden, moved to Houghton Hall in Norfolk and remained there as Walpole's mistress until his death in March 1751. Her financial support may have saved him from dying bankrupt. In Walpole's many absences Hannah Norsa was escorted in her landau and six horses by his chaplain, Rev William Paxton, who received the position as a small part of the Walpole family compensation for his father's defence of Walpole's father, the Prime Minister.

His estranged widow became the 15th Baroness Clinton succeeding in her own right after the death of her cousin Hugh Fortescue, 1st Earl Clinton. She had remarried on Walpole's death but soon separated from her second husband, Hon Sewallis Shirley, a son of the 1st Earl Ferrers and Comptroller of Queen Charlotte's Household. Lady Clinton died at Pisa, in Tuscany, in 1781, and was buried at Leghorn, "a woman of very singular character and considered half mad" (according to her friend, Selina, Countess of Huntingdon). Walpole himself is buried in the Church of St Martin at Tours on the Houghton Hall estate.

Progeny
Both the Earl of Orford and his wife Baroness Clinton were succeeded in all their titles by their son George Walpole, 3rd Earl of Orford and 16th Baron Clinton (1730–1791), a celebrated falconer, who left no legitimate children and died insane.

Career
Robert Walpole held the following posts at some time between 1701 and 1751:

 Clerk of the Pells (1721–1739)
 Auditor of the Receipt of the Exchequer (1739–1751)
 Ranger of Richmond Park
 High Steward of Yarmouth
 Lord Lieutenant of Devon (1733–1751)

References

Notes
 
 
 thepeerage.com

1701 births
1751 deaths
Earls in the Peerage of Great Britain
Lord-Lieutenants of Devon
Orford, Robert Walpole, Earl of
Walpole, Robert, Orford
Robert
18th-century British politicians
Knights of the Bath
People from Walpole, Norfolk
Earls of Orford